Victor Arnold refers to:

Victor Arnold (Austrian actor) (1873–1914)
Victor Arnold (American actor) (1936–2012)